Malusi islands is an archipelago in Gulf of Finland, administratively belonging to Estonia. The archipelago consists of three islands: Põhja-Malusi, Vahekari and Lõuna-Malusi island.

Nature 
The islands are one of the main habitats of Estonian grey seals in the Gulf of Finland. Many of them are found on the Malusi islands, as they are protected seal breeding areas.

Some species such as wild strawberries and whortleberry have disappeared.

References

Islands of Estonia